David Bingham (born 26 May 1939) is an Australian sailor. He competed in the 5.5 Metre event at the 1960 Summer Olympics.

References

External links
 

1939 births
Living people
Australian male sailors (sport)
Olympic sailors of Australia
Sailors at the 1960 Summer Olympics – 5.5 Metre
Sportspeople from Melbourne